Hobart Township may refer to the following places in the United States:

Hobart Township, Lake County, Indiana
Hobart Township, Otter Tail County, Minnesota
Hobart Township, Barnes County, North Dakota

See also 
Hobart (disambiguation)

Township name disambiguation pages